Peter Lawson (January 10, 1821 – March 22, 1911) was an Ontario political figure. He represented Norfolk South in the 1st Canadian Parliament as a Liberal member.

He was born in Woodstock, Connecticut in 1821, the son of Thomas Lawson and Lucy Johnson, and came to Upper Canada with his family in 1830. He worked as a tanner in Port Dover. In 1842, he married Sarah Ladd. Lawson served as reeve for Woodhouse Township in Norfolk County. He died in Port Dover at the age of 90.

References 

1821 births
1911 deaths
Members of the House of Commons of Canada from Ontario
Liberal Party of Canada MPs
People from Woodstock, Connecticut